Němčice is a municipality and village in Prachatice District in the South Bohemian Region of the Czech Republic. It has about 200 inhabitants.

Administrative parts
The village of Sedlovice is an administrative part of Němčice.

References

Villages in Prachatice District